= Melkikh =

Melkikh (Russian: Мелких, from мелкий meaning small) is a gender-neutral Russian surname.
